Tatopani is a village development committee in Jumla District in the Karnali Zone of north-western Nepal. At the time of the 1991 Nepal census it had a population of 3819 persons living in 774 individual households.

See also
Tatopani, Jumla, rural municipality

References

External links
UN map of the municipalities of Jumla District

Populated places in Jumla District